Antonio Rosato (26 December 1954 – 10 January 2017) was an Italian-Canadian actor and comedian, who appeared in television and films. He was best known as a cast member on both SCTV and Saturday Night Live, and for voicing Luigi in The Adventures of Super Mario Bros. 3 and Super Mario World.

Early life and career beginnings
Rosato was born in Naples, Italy, and came to Canada at age four. He was raised in Halifax, Ottawa, and Toronto. He graduated from Oakwood Collegiate Institute. He planned to study chiropractic medicine, but dropped out of the University of Toronto after he began doing improv comedy at The Second City.

Career
Rosato first gained attention when he and Robin Duke joined the cast of the first incarnation of SCTV in its final season during the fall of 1980. His most well-known character on the program was the notoriously drunk TV chef Marcello Sebastiani. Rosato then moved with Duke to the cast of Saturday Night Live for the 1981–82 season. Following Jean Doumanian's tenure during the sixth season and Dick Ebersol trying to retool the show (and relying on Eddie Murphy and Joe Piscopo to spice up the sketches),  Rosato only appeared on the show for one year before leaving due to differences with Ebersol and an expired contract.

Rosato is one of three SCTV cast members (along with Duke and, later, Martin Short) to appear on Saturday Night Live and the first SNL cast member to not be born in either the United States or Canada. Celebrities impersonated by Rosato on SCTV include: Lou Costello (whom he also impersonated when he was a cast member on Saturday Night Live), William Conrad, Danny Thomas, Woodstock co-organizer Chip Monck, SNL cast member John Belushi, Tony Orlando, Don Ho, and Ella Fitzgerald. His characters on SNL, despite his short tenure, were memorable as well, and included Ed Asner (in character as Lou Grant), Captain Kangaroo, and U.S. Attorney General Ed Meese.

In 1983, he starred as Aldo, the busboy in the short-lived Bea Arthur series, Amanda's. The show was based on Fawlty Towers but was not well-received by audiences and was cancelled after 10 episodes.

Rosato next appeared on the Canadian police drama Night Heat, playing Arthur "Whitey" Morelli from 1985 through 1989. He continued to appear in television and film throughout the 1990s.

Voice work
In autumn of 1990, Rosato portrayed Nintendo's character Luigi on DiC's television show The Adventures of Super Mario Bros. 3 (based on Super Mario Bros. 3). He continued his role as Luigi in 1991 for the Super Mario World cartoon. Rosato had a small voice part in Resident Evil 3: Nemesis as Dario Rosso and the titular creature. In Bakugan: Gundalian Invaders, he voiced Dharak.

Rosato also provided voices for many other animated series including Pelswick, George and Martha, The Busy World of Richard Scarry, The Adventures of Sam and Max: Freelance Police, Mythic Warriors: Guardians of the Legend, Monster by Mistake, The Ripping Friends, Bakugan: Mechtanium Surge, Da Boom Crew, Get Ed and Odd Job Jack.

Personal life
Rosato married Leah Murray on 31 December 2003; together they have a daughter. After seven years together, Rosato and Murray's marriage ended in a divorce in 2010.

Death
Rosato died of a heart attack on 10 January 2017, at the age of 62. Saturday Night Live paid tribute to Rosato at the end of its 14 January 2017 episode.

Legal troubles
On 5 May 2005, Rosato was arrested and charged with criminal harassment of his wife Leah, who asserted that his deteriorating mental health had caused her to fear for her safety and that of the couple's infant daughter. The charge was laid after Rosato complained repeatedly to Toronto and Kingston police that his wife, who had recently left him, and daughter had been abducted and replaced by impostors, a belief characteristic of Capgras delusion, a delusional misidentification syndrome with which the Crown's expert psychiatrist had diagnosed Rosato, according to Rosato's lawyer, Daniel Brodsky. It was alleged that the harassment occurred from 28 December 2003 and escalated until 21 April 2005. In spite of the diagnosis, Rosato, who denied mental illness and refused to plead insanity, was held for over two years without bail at a maximum-security detention centre. Brodsky, who called his client's two-year detention awaiting trial "shocking," asserted that Rosato "spent more time in custody on a harassment charge" than anyone ever convicted of the offence in Canada, estimating that "on average, someone convicted of criminal harassment spends one day in jail and two years on probation." The trial finally commenced on 7 August 2007, in Kingston and it ended on 5 September. Prosecutors downgraded the charge to a summary offence from an indictable offence, handing Rosato a conditional discharge, including a psychiatric hospital residence order, of which he ended up serving 19 months of a maximum of three years. Rosato was released from the hospital in March 2009 but remained on probation until September 2010.

Filmography

Film

Television

Video games

References

External links
 
 
 
 

1954 births
2017 deaths
Canadian male film actors
Canadian male television actors
Canadian sketch comedians
Canadian male video game actors
Canadian male voice actors
Canadian television personalities
Comedians from Toronto
Italian emigrants to Canada
Male actors from Naples
Male actors from Toronto
20th-century Canadian male actors
21st-century Canadian male actors